

Births and deaths 
 William Kimber (1872–1961), English morris musician
 Ralph Vaughan Williams (1872–1958), English composer and song collector
 Sam Larner (1878–1965), English folk singer
 Percy Grainger (1882–1961), Australian composer who collected and recorded English folk songs
 Harry Cox (1885–1971), English folk singer
 Lewis 'Scan' Tester (1886–1972), English folk musician

Collections of songs or music
 1651: English Dancing Master (1st of at least 17 editions), published by John Playford (1623–1686)
 1725: A Collection of Old Ballads, Ambrose Philips (1674–1749) (ed.)
 1765: Reliques of Ancient English Poetry Thomas Percy (1721–1811) (ed.)
 1765: Mother Goose's Melody published by Thomas Carnan (1737–1788)
 1788: Yorkshire Garland, republished in 1809 by Joseph Ritson (1752–1803) 
 1793: Northumberland Garland, republished in 1809 by Joseph Ritson (1752–1803)
 1798: Joshua Jackson's Book (manuscript), by Joshua Jackson (1763–1869)
 1827: Minstrelsy Ancient and Modern, published by William Motherwell (1797–1835)
 1842: Nursery Rhymes of England, collected and edited by James Orchard Halliwell (1820–1889)
 1849: Popular Rhymes and Nursery Tales, collected and edited by James Orchard Halliwell (1820–1889)
 1859: Popular Music of Olden Time, William Chappell (1809–1888) (ed.)
 1882: Northumbrian Minstrelsy – A Collection of the Ballads, Melodies and Small-Pipe Tunes of Northumbria, J. Collingwood Bruce (1805–1892) and John Stokoe (eds.)
 1882: English and Scottish Popular Ballads, Francis James Child (1825–1896) (ed.)
 1893: English County Songs, collected and edited by J. A. Fuller Maitland (1856–1936) and Lucy Broadwood (1858–1929)
 1893: Songs and Ballads of Northern England, collected and edited by John Stokoe

References 

English folk music by date
Folk
Folk
Folk
Folk
Folk
Folk
Folk
Folk